In mathematical physics and the theory of partial differential equations, the solitary wave solution of the form  is said to be orbitally stable if any solution with the initial data sufficiently close to  forever remains in a given small neighborhood of the trajectory of

Formal definition
Formal definition is as follows. Consider the dynamical system

We assume that the system is -invariant,
so that
 for any  and any .

Assume that , so that  is a solution to the dynamical system.
We call such solution a solitary wave.

We say that the solitary wave  is orbitally stable if for any  there is  such that for any  with  there is a solution  defined for all  such that , and such that this solution satisfies

Example
According to 
,
the solitary wave solution  to the nonlinear Schrödinger equation

where  is a smooth real-valued function, is orbitally stable if the Vakhitov–Kolokolov stability criterion is satisfied:

 

where

 

is the charge of the solution , which is conserved in time (at least if the solution  is sufficiently smooth).

It was also shown,
 is Lyapunov stable, with the Lyapunov function

See also
Stability theory
Asymptotic stability
Linear stability
Lyapunov stability
Vakhitov−Kolokolov stability criterion

References

Stability theory
Solitons